Birendra Prasad Mahato is a Nepalese politician, belonging to the People's Socialist Party, Nepal currently serving as the member of the 2nd Federal Parliament of Nepal. In the 2022 Nepalese general election, he won the election from Siraha 4 (constituency). He had previously served as a member of the 2nd Constituent Assembly from the party list of Madheshi Jana Adhikar Forum.

References

Living people
Nepal MPs 2022–present
Members of the 2nd Nepalese Constituent Assembly
Belarus State Economic University alumni
1969 births